The 1986–87 European Cup was the 22nd edition of the European Cup, IIHF's premier European club ice hockey tournament. The season started on October 2, 1986, and finished on September 27, 1987.

The tournament was won by CSKA Moscow, who won the final group.

Preliminary round

First round

* Official score, due to irregular registration of two Mont-Blanc players

 Tappara,   
 HC Lugano,   
 EC KAC,  
 TMH Polonia Bytom    :  bye

Second round

 Färjestads BK,   
 Kölner EC,   
 TJ VSŽ Košice,  
 CSKA Moscow    :  bye

Third round

Final Group
(Lugano, Ticino, Switzerland)

Final group standings

References
 Season 1987

1986–87 in European ice hockey
IIHF European Cup